The Guilt of Silence is a 1918 American silent drama film directed by Elmer Clifton and starring Monroe Salisbury, Ruth Clifford and Alfred Allen.

Cast
 Monroe Salisbury as Mathew 'Silent' Smith
 Ruth Clifford as Mary
 Alfred Allen as Harkness
 Betty Schade as Amy
 Sam De Grasse as Gambler Joe

References

Bibliography
James Robert Parish & Michael R. Pitts. Film directors: a guide to their American films. Scarecrow Press, 1974.

External links
 

1918 films
1918 drama films
1910s English-language films
American silent feature films
Silent American drama films
American black-and-white films
Universal Pictures films
Films directed by Elmer Clifton
1910s American films